Katherine Bingham "Kate" Moorehead (born 1970) is an American priest of the Episcopal Church and the tenth dean of St. John's Cathedral, Jacksonville, and the Diocese of Florida. Moorehead was installed as the dean on January 10, 2010.

Life and career
Moorehead was born in New Haven, Connecticut. She is the great-granddaughter of Hiram Bingham III, U.S. Senator from Connecticut and explorer best known for uncovering Machu Picchu. Moorehead graduated Phi Beta Kappa from Vassar College, receiving The Sara Caitlin Award for Religious Leadership and graduated cum laude with a Master of Divinity degree from Virginia Theological Seminary, receiving the Harris Award for Academic Excellence and Leadership Ability.

Moorehead served as rector at St. Margaret’s Episcopal Church in Boiling Springs, South Carolina from 1998 to 2003 and St. James Episcopal Church in Wichita, Kansas from 2003 to 2009.

Writings 
Get Over Yourselves! God’s Here!. (2009) Kansas: St. Marks Press.
Organic God: Lenten Meditations on the Words of Jesus. (2006) Maryland: Rowman & Littlefield Publishing Group.
Between Two Worlds: Daily Readings for Advent. (2004) Maryland: Rowman & Littlefield Publishing Group.

References

External links
Episcopal Diocese of Florida website
St. John’s Cathedral website

1970 births
Living people
American Episcopal priests
Religious leaders from New Haven, Connecticut
Vassar College alumni
Virginia Theological Seminary alumni